Gelora Handayani Stadium is a multi-purpose stadium in Wonosari, Gunung Kidul Regency, Special Region of Yogyakarta, Indonesia.  It is currently used mostly for soccer matches and also sometimes for athletics. The stadium has a capacity of 10,000.

References

External links
Stadium image

Buildings and structures in the Special Region of Yogyakarta
Football venues in Indonesia
Multi-purpose stadiums in Indonesia